Windella is a suburb in the City of Maitland in the Hunter Region of New South Wales, Australia. It is a growing residential area located immediately north of the New England Highway and adjacent to Maitland Airport, halfway between Lochinvar and Rutherford. At the 2011 census, 595 people resided in Windella.

References

Suburbs of Maitland, New South Wales